The 2016–17 Towson Tigers men's basketball team represented Towson University during the 2016–17 NCAA Division I men's basketball season. The Tigers, led by sixth year head coach Pat Skerry, played their home games at SECU Arena in Towson, Maryland as members of the Colonial Athletic Association. They finished the season 20–13, 11–7 in CAA play to finish in third place. They defeated Northeastern in the quarterfinals of the CAA tournament to advance to the semifinals where they lost to College of Charleston. Despite a 20 win season, the Tigers declined to participate in a postseason tournament.

Previous season
The Tigers finished the 2015–16 season 20–13, 11–7 in CAA play to finish in a three way tie for third place. They lost in the quarterfinals of the CAA tournament to CAA tournament. The Tigers received an invitation to the inaugural Vegas 16, which only had eight teams, where they lost in the quarterfinals to Oakland.

Departures

Incoming transfers

Recruiting

Recruiting class of 2017

Roster

Schedule and results

|-
!colspan=12 style=| Non-conference regular season

|-
!colspan=9 style=| CAA regular season

|-
!colspan=9 style=| CAA tournament

See also
 2016–17 Towson Tigers women's basketball team

References

Towson Tigers men's basketball seasons
Towson